The Los Angeles Women's Championship was a golf tournament on the LPGA Tour from 1997 to 2000. It was played at the Oakmont Country Club in Glendale, California from 1997 to 1999 and at the Wood Ranch Golf Club in Simi Valley, California in 2000.

Winners
Los Angeles Women's Championship
2000 Laura Davies

Valley of the Stars Championship
1999 Catrin Nilsmark

Los Angeles Women's Championship
1998 Dale Eggeling
1997 Terry-Jo Myers

References

Former LPGA Tour events
Golf in California
Glendale, California
Women's sports in California